Manurewa Central School is a Primary School (years 1–6) in Manurewa, a suburb of Manukau City, Auckland Region, New Zealand.  Manurewa Central has celebrated its 100-year school reunion on October 20–22, 2006.

Manurewa Central is a Duffy Books in Homes school which provides five or more free books to students annually.

Manurewa Central School opened in 1906. In 2006 it had been 100 years since the opening of MCS (Manurewa Central School). Each year, 8 year 6 students are chosen to be 'School Councillors'. These school councillors help run the school and organize fun activities for other students to do like; Funtime Lunchtime, Wheels Day, Black out day etc. They support the students in their learning, sports and their future.

Notes

External links
Manurewa Central School Website

Primary schools in Auckland